Gimme All Mine is the seventh solo studio album by American recording artist Kokane.

Track listing
All tracks written by Jerry B. Long (Kokane) except where otherwise noted.

 "Twilight Zone" – 4:20
 "Killin Fileds" – 3:41
 "Baptized in tha Funk" – 4:18
 "Gimme All Mine" – 3:49
 "Made a Difference" – 4:28
 "Lay You Down" (Gregory Hutchinson, Kevin Gulley) – 5:04
 "Can a Thug Get to Heaven" – 3:57
 "Rollin' Up On Hoez" – 3:52
 "Gettin' Ova" (J Golden) – 3:30
 "Jelly Jar" (West Coast Stone) – 4:46
 "Travel The World" – 3:43
 "Sleepin In my Bed" – 4:08

Total Length: 49:36

Personnel
 Andre "Bokie" Edwards, Cynthia Patterson, Jerry B. Long (Kokane) – background vocals on track 2, "Killin Fileds"
 Above The Law – featured on track 6, "Lay You Down"
 Eternal – featured on track 9, "Gettin' Ova"
 West Coast Stone – featured on track 10, "Jelly Jar"
 Executive producers – Erik "Mr. E" Ramos, J. Wells, Kokane, Rob Racks
 Producers – Kokane (track 4), Adam "Swerve" Trujillo (track 8), Tha Chill (tracks: 1 and 2), Vitamin D (tracks 5, 6, and 11), West Coast Stone (tracks 3, 7, 10, and 12)
 Ken Lee – mastering
 Erik "Mr. E" Ramos – recording, co-producer on track 4, "Gimme All Mine", and mixing on tracks 3 to 12
 Tha Chill – mixing on tracks 1 and 2
 3rd Eye Dezine – artwork and photography

External links

2010 albums
Kokane albums